Ralph Germeyn was Archdeacon of Barnstaple until 1308.

References

Archdeacons of Barnstaple